Borsunlu is a village and municipality in the Goranboy Rayon of Azerbaijan. It has a population of 3,348. The municipality consists of the villages of Borsunlu and Qazaxlar.

References 

Populated places in Goranboy District